Bolan is an unincorporated community and census-designated place in Worth County, Iowa, United States. As of the 2010 Census the population was 33. It lies at  (43.3719061, −93.1193681), at an altitude of 1,227 feet (374 m). The community is part of the Mason City Micropolitan Statistical Area.

Bolan's claim to fame was in 1989 when all the town's residents appeared on Late Night with David Letterman.

History
Bolan got its start in the year 1886, following construction of the railroad through that territory. Bolan was platted the next year. Bolan's population was 50 in 1902, and 57 in 1925.

Geography
According to the United States Census Bureau, the city has a total area of 2.89 square miles (7.49 km2), all land.

Demographics

As of the census of 2010, there were 33 people, 11 households, and 9 families residing in the town. The population density was 11.4 people per square mile (4.4/km2). There were 13 housing units at an average density of 4.5 per square mile (1.7/km2). The racial makeup of the town was 100.0% White.

There were 11 households, out of which 45.5% had children under the age of 18 living with them, 54.5% were married couples living together, 27.3% had a female householder with no husband present, and 18.2% were non-families. 18.2% of all households were made up of individuals, and 9.1% had someone living alone who was 65 years of age or older. The average household size was 3.00 and the average family size was 3.44.

In the city the population was spread out, with 39.4% under the age of 18, 3% from 18 to 24, 30.3% from 25 to 44, 12.2% from 45 to 64, and 15.2% who were 65 years of age or older. The median age was 28.3 years. The gender makeup of the city was 48.5% male and 51.5% female.

References

Unincorporated communities in Worth County, Iowa
Unincorporated communities in Iowa
Mason City, Iowa micropolitan area